Félix Mantilla defeated Karim Alami in the final, 7–6(7–2), 6–3, 6–3 to win the singles tennis title at the 1999 Barcelona Open.

Todd Martin was the defending champion, but he lost in the semifinals to Alami.

This tournament marked the ATP Tour debut for future world No. 5 Tommy Robredo; he lost in the third round to Martin.

Seeds
Champion seeds are indicated in bold text while text in italics indicates the round in which those seeds were eliminated.

Draw

Finals

Top half

Section 1

Section 2

Bottom half

Section 3

Section 4

References

Singles
Godo